The 2000 OFC Nations Cup Final was an association football match that took place on 28 June 2000 at the Stade Pater, Papeete. It was the final of the 2000 OFC Nations Cup which was the fifth edition of the OFC Nations Cup, an international competition for national teams in the Oceania Football Confederation.

It was contested between Australia and New Zealand in what was a repeat of the 1998 final which New Zealand won. This was also New Zealand's third appearance in a continental final after also appearing in the 1973 final which they won. For Australia, this was their fourth appearance in the final with Australia also winning the 1980 and 1996. After both teams won their respective groups, Australia defeated Vanuatu while New Zealand defeated the Solomon Islands.

In the final, goals from Shaun Murphy and Craig Foster gave Australia a 2–0 win over New Zealand to record their third OFC title. This also meant that as winners of the Nations Cup, they also qualified for the 2001 FIFA Confederations Cup which was held in South Korea and Japan as representative of the OFC.

Route to the final

Australia
As finalists in the 1998 OFC Nations Cup, and the OFC's top-ranked side, the "Socceroos" were given entry straight into the tournament finals. They progressed comfortably through the group stage, accounting for Cook Islands and Solomon Islands comfortably 17-0 and 6-0 respectively. In the semi-final, they played Vanuatu, winning 1-0 in a match that was closer than expected. Australia's Clayton Zane was the tournament's top scorer going into the final, with 5 goals.

New Zealand
Like Australia, New Zealand were given direct entry into the tournament finals, as 1998 OFC Nations Cup champions and the OFC's second ranked side. They beat both Tahiti and Vanuatu by 2 goals to progress from the group stage. In the semi-finals, they played Solomon Islands and won 2-0 to move through to the final.

Pre-match

Analysis
Despite New Zealand having won the 1998 OFC Nations Cup final, Australia went into the game as favourites, ranked 15 spots ahead of New Zealand in FIFA World Rankings.

Match

First half
Australia was the better side for much of the match, although New Zealand did create some chances. Australia took the lead 5 minutes from half time, as Shaun Murphy scored off a Stan Lazaridis corner.

Second half
Australia's ascendency continued, and when Danny Tiatto's cross was finished by Craig Foster midway through the second half, the result was all but secured for Australia.

Match details

Post match
Australia's win qualified them for the 2001 FIFA Confederations Cup, and was their third OFC Nations Cup win their first since 1996.

See also
 Australia–New Zealand soccer rivalry

References

External links
 RSSF.  Accessed 21 February 2010.
 Fifa

2000
Football in French Polynesia
Final
2000
2000
2000 in Australian soccer
2000 in New Zealand association football
2000 in French Polynesian sport
June 2000 sports events in Oceania